Finskören  is a Swedish island belonging to the Kalix archipelago. It is located in the Kalix River. It has no shore connection and has some summer houses.

References 

Islands of Norrbotten County
Swedish islands in the Baltic